John C. Boothroyd is the Burt and Marion Avery Professor in the Department of Microbiology and Immunology at Stanford University. In 2016 he was elected to the National Academy of Sciences in Microbial Biology and Animal, Nutritional, and Applied Microbial Sciences.

Education 
Boothroyd has a BSc from McGill University in Montreal, Canada. He earned his PhD from Edinburgh University in Scotland, in Molecular Biology.

Career 
Boothroyd worked as a scientist at Wellcome Research Laboratories in the Department of Immunochemistry and Molecular Biology. He joined the faculty at Stanford University in 1982. Boothroyd was appointed to the position of the Burt and Marion Avery Professor of Immunology in February 2015 at the Stanford School of Medicine.

In 2018 he was chosen to be the faculty director of the Stanford-hosted global meeting of the 2018-2019 Schmidt Science Fellows.

Honors 
In 2008 he was awarded the Leuckart Medal from the German Society for Parasitology. In 2016 he was elected to become a member of the US National Academy of Sciences.

References 

Living people
McGill University alumni
Stanford University faculty
Stanford University School of Medicine faculty
American microbiologists
American molecular biologists
American immunologists
Members of the United States National Academy of Sciences
21st-century American scientists
Year of birth missing (living people)